Willian Pereira da Rocha is a Brazilian footballer who plays as a defender for Tombense.

Career
On 14 February 2018, Rocha signed for Nagoya Grampus on loan for the 2018 season.

References

External links
Willian Rocha at playmakerstats.com (English version of ogol.com.br)

1989 births
Living people
Brazilian footballers
Association football defenders
Paulista Futebol Clube players
Tombense Futebol Clube players
Figueirense FC players
América Futebol Clube (MG) players
Sport Club do Recife players
Grasshopper Club Zürich players
Club Athletico Paranaense players
Avaí FC players
Swiss Super League players
Campeonato Brasileiro Série A players
People from Jundiaí
Footballers from São Paulo (state)